Guadalupe River State Park is a Texas state park located on a section of the Guadalupe River in Kendall and Comal Counties, northwest of Bulverde, Texas United States and is administered by the Texas Parks and Wildlife Department. The land was acquired by deed from private owners in 1974 and was opened to the public in 1983.

670 acres of 1938.7 acre park is located on the north side of the river and is named the Bauer Unit, after the German couple that settled there in the mid-1800s. There are no amenities or facilities in the Bauer Unit just trails. The Bamberger Trail is named after J. David Bamberger, who sold most of the land that became the Bauer Unit to the State of Texas in 1974.

Features

The park has four miles of river frontage for canoeing, fishing, swimming and tubing. Other activities include picnicking, hiking, birdwatching and camping. There is a 5.3 mile equestrian trail that can also be used for mountain biking. There is a two-hour guided interpretive tour of the adjacent Honey Creek State Natural Area.

Flora
Bald Cypress, sycamore, pecan, live oak, Ashe juniper, Texas persimmon, cedar elm and mesquite are species of trees that can be found in the park. Frostweed, antelope horns, snow-on-the-mountain, prairie verbena, twistleaf yucca,  lace cactus, agarita, poison ivy and greenbriar are plants documented in the park.

Fauna
White-tailed deer are common throughout the park, as well as raccoons, armadillos, and skunks. The Ashe juniper woodland provides nesting grounds for the endangered golden-cheeked warbler. The Northern cardinal, lesser goldfinch, American robin, Carolina chickadee, black-chinned hummingbird, chipping sparrow, painted bunting and many other bird species are also found in the park.

References

External links

 Texas Parks and Wildlife: Guadalupe River State Park
 Geology and Hydrostratigraphy of Guadalupe River State Park and Honey Creek State Natural Area, Kendall and Comal Counties, Texas United States Geological Survey
Guadalupe River State Park featured in news story from KPRC on the Texas Archive of the Moving Image

State parks of Texas
Protected areas of Comal County, Texas
Protected areas of Kendall County, Texas